Robert James Ketchum Graham (December 19, 1831 – March 9, 1889) was an Ontario political figure. He represented Hastings West in the Legislative Assembly of Ontario as a Conservative member from 1867 to 1874.

He was the son of a Scottish immigrant, James Graham. He served as reeve of Sidney Township from 1865 to 1867.

References

External links 

The Canadian parliamentary companion and annual register, 1874, HJ Morgan

1831 births
1889 deaths
Canadian people of Scottish descent
Mayors of places in Ontario
People from Quinte West
Progressive Conservative Party of Ontario MPPs